Completely Well,  released in 1969, is a studio album by the blues guitarist B. B. King. It is notable for the inclusion of "The Thrill Is Gone", which became a hit on both the R&B/soul and pop charts and which earned him a Grammy Award for Best Male R&B Vocal Performance in 1970.

The album was released in the US as an LP record in 1969 and as a CD in 1987; in the UK only as an LP. San Francisco critic Ralph J. Gleason's liner notes are mostly a profile of King, with only a passing reference to the actual music contained in King`s commercial breakthrough album.

Track listing
"So Excited" (B.B. King, Gerald Jemmott) -- 5:34
"No Good" (Ferdinand Washington, B.B. King) -- 4:35
"You're Losin' Me" (Ferdinand Washington, B.B. King) -- 4:54
"What Happened" (B.B. King) -- 4:41
"Confessin' the Blues" (Jay McShann, Walter Brown) -- 4:56
"Key to My Kingdom" (Maxwell Davis, Joe Josea, Claude Baum) -- 3:18
"Cryin' Won't Help You Now" (Sam Ling, Jules Taub; LP has only B.B.) -- 6:30
"You're Mean" (B.B. King, Gerald Jemmott, Hugh McCracken, Paul Harris, Herbie Lovelle) -- 9:39
"The Thrill Is Gone" (Rick Darnell, Roy Hawkins; LP has Arthur H [Art] Benson, Dale Pettite) -- 5:30

Personnel
B.B. King: Vocals, lead guitar
Hugh McCracken: Rhythm guitar
Paul Harris: organ, acoustic and Fender Rhodes electric piano
Jerry Jemmott: Bass
Herbie Lovelle: Drums
Bert "Super Charts" DeCoteaux: string and horn arrangements

References

B.B. King albums
1969 albums
Albums produced by Bill Szymczyk
BluesWay Records albums